Nikolay Afanasyev (born 11 August 1965) is a Russian track and field athlete. He competed in the men's decathlon at the 1996 Summer Olympics.

References

1965 births
Living people
Sportspeople from Yekaterinburg
Russian decathletes
Olympic decathletes
Olympic athletes of Russia
Athletes (track and field) at the 1996 Summer Olympics
Russian Athletics Championships winners